Events in the year 1943 in Germany.

Incumbents

National level
Head of State and Chancellor

 Adolf Hitler (the Führer) (Nazi Party)

Events

 18 January – World War II: Soviet officials announce they have broken the Wehrmacht's siege of Leningrad.
 18 January – The Warsaw Ghetto Uprising begins.
 27 January – World War II: 64 bombers mount the first all American air raid against Germany (Wilhelmshaven is the target).
 29 January – German police arrest alleged necrophiliac Bruno Ludke.
 29 January – Dr Ernst Kaltenbrunner succeeds the late Reinhard Heydrich as head of the RSHA SS-Reichssicherheitshauptamt controlling the Schutzstaffel Gestapo
 2 February – World War II: In Russia, the Battle of Stalingrad comes to an end with the surrender of the German 6th Army and its 91,000 remaining soldiers.
 3 February – World War II: The Four Chaplains of the U.S. Army are drowned, when their ship is struck by a German torpedo.
 14 February – World War II: Battle of the Kasserine Pass: German General Erwin Rommel and his Afrika Korps launch an offensive against Allied defenses in Tunisia.
 16 February – World War II: The Soviet Union reconquers Kharkov, but is later driven out in the Third Battle of Kharkov
 18 February – In a speech at the Berlin Sportpalast, German Propaganda Minister Joseph Goebbels declare a "Total War" against the Allies.
 18 February – The Nazis arrest the members of the White Rose movement.
 22 February – Members of White Rose are executed in Nazi Germany.
 28 February – Operation Gunnerside: 6 Norwegians led by Joachim Ronneberg successfully attack the heavy water plant Vemork.
 1 March – Heinz Guderian becomes the Inspector-General of the Armoured Troops for Nazi Germany's Army.
 13 March – Holocaust: German forces liquidate the Jewish ghetto in Kraków.
 16 March – 19 March – World War II: 22 ships from Convoys HX 229/SC 122 and one U-boat are sunk in the largest North Atlantic U-boat wolfpack attack of the war.
 22 March – World War II: The entire population of Khatyn in Belarus is burnt alive by the German Dirlewanger Brigade in retaliation for an attack of a German convoy by Soviet partisans.
 26 March – Adolf Hitler writes to Benito Mussolini that Russia is so weakened by the defence of Stalingrad that it cannot possibly be a serious menace.
 13 April – World War II: Radio Berlin announces the discovery by Wehrmacht of mass graves of Poles killed by Soviets in the Katyn massacre.
 6 May – World War II: Six U-boats are sunk after sinking 12 ships from Convoy ONS 5, regarded as the turning point in the North Atlantic U-boat war.
 13 May – World War II: German Afrika Korps and Italian troops in North Africa surrender to Allied forces.
 15 May – The Comintern is dissolved in Moscow.
 16 May – World War II: Operation Chastise by RAF 617 Sqdn is carried out on German dams.
 16 May – Holocaust: The Warsaw Ghetto Uprising ends.
 24 May – Holocaust: Josef Mengele becomes the chief medical officer of Auschwitz.
 5 July – World War II: Operation Citadel commences, resulting in the Battle of Kursk – The largest tank battle in history begins, with German Panther tanks seeing combat for the first time.
 12 July – World War II – Battle of Prokhorovka: The Wehrmacht and the Red Army fight to a draw.
 24 July – World War II: Operation Gomorrah begins: British and Canadian aeroplanes bomb Hamburg by night, those of the Americans by day.
 27 July – World War II: Operation Gomorrah – The continued British bombing of Hamburg, initiates a firestorm. The fire rages through the night into the morning of the 28th, causing the majority of Operation Gomorrah's deaths.
 3 August – World War II: Operation Gomorrah closes, with an estimated 42,600 killed and 37,000 wounded; much of Hamburg is leveled.
 23 August – The Battle of Kursk ends with a serious strategic defeat for the German forces.
 24 August – World War II: – Heinrich Himmler is named Reichsminister of the Interior in Germany.
 29 August – World War II: Germany dissolves the Danish government after it refuses to deal with a wave of strikes and disturbances to the satisfaction of the German authorities (see Occupation of Denmark).
 8 September – World War II: Frascati bombing raid September 8, 1943: The USAAF bombs the German General Headquarters for the Mediterranean zone.
 12 September – World War II: German paratroopers rescue Benito Mussolini from imprisonment, in Operation Eiche.
 13 October – World War II: The new government of Italy sides with the Allies and declares war on Germany.
 17 October – World War II: The last commerce raider, auxiliary cruiser Michel, was sunk off Japan by United States submarine Tarpon.
 22 October – World War II: The RAF delivers a highly destructive airstrike on the German industrial and population center of Kassel.
 15 November – Porajmos: German SS leader Heinrich Himmler orders that Gypsies and "part-Gypsies" be put "on the same level as Jews and placed in concentration camps."
 18 November – World War II: The Royal Air Force opens its bombing campaign against Berlin, with 440 planes causing only light damage and killing 131. The RAF loses 9 aircraft and 53 aviators.
 23 November – The Deutsche Opernhaus on Bismarckstraße in the Berlin neighborhood of Charlottenburg is destroyed.
 2 December – A Luftwaffe bombing raid on the harbour of Bari, Italy, sinks an American ship with a mustard gas stockpile, causing numerous fatalities; the exact death toll is unresolved, as the bombing raid itself causes hundreds of deaths as well.
 11 December – United States Army Air Corps raids a U-boat yard at Emden, losing 20 planes but shooting down 138 German fighters.
 20 December – First flight of a true four-engined version of the troubled He 177A heavy bomber, as the Heinkel He 177 V102 prototype of the Heinkel He 177B series makes its maiden flight with four separate Daimler-Benz DB 603 engines at the Heinkel-Sud factory airfield in Schwechat.

Births

 6 January – Wilhelm Kuhweide, German sailor
 14 January – Manfred Wolke, German boxer
 22 January – Wilhelm Genazino, German author and journalist (died 2018)
 24 January - Peter Struck, German politician (died 2012)
 25 January -
 Dagmar Berghoff, German journalist and television presenter
 Roy Black, German actor and singer (died 1991)
 1 February – Brun-Otto Bryde, German judge
 11 February – Gerhard Glogowski, German politician
 12 February – Rainer Eppelmann, German politician
 13 February – Friedrich Christian Delius, German writer (died 2022)	
 15 February – Elke Heidenreich, German author and television presenter
 21 February – Paul Kirchhof, German judge
 22 February – Horst Köhler, German politician, former President of Germany
 27 February – Klaus Köste, German gymnast (died 2012)	
 24 March – Marika Kilius, German pair skater
 12 April 
Lothar Kobluhn, German football player (died 2019)
Michael Otto, German entrepreneur
 16 April 
Christian Herwartz, German Catholic priest (died 2022)
Petro Tyschtschenko, German businessman
 19 April – Claus Theo Gärtner, German actor
 2 May – Manfred Schnelldorfer, German figure skater	
 6 May – Wolfgang Reinhard, German pole vaulter (died 2011)
 10 May – Wolfgang Porsche, German manager
 18 May – Helmut Haussmann, German politician	
 22 May – Gesine Schwan, German politician
 24 May – Gerd Gies, German politician
 31 May – Antje Vollmer, German theologian and politician (died 2023)
 28 June – Klaus von Klitzing, German physicist, Nobel Prize laureate
 30 June – Hartmann von der Tann, German journalist
 30 June – Dieter Kottysch, German boxer (died 2017)
 4 July – Konrad "Conny" Bauer, German trombonist
 6 July – Hans-Jürgen Papier, German judge
 7 July – Jürgen Geschke, German track cyclist
 25 July 
 Hans-Peter Kaul, German judge (died 2014)
 Erika Steinbach, German politician
 29 July 
Michael Holm, German singer
Ingrid Krämer, German diver	
 4 August – Barbara Saß-Viehweger, German politician, lawyer and civil law notary
 12 August – Herta Däubler-Gmelin, politician
 27 August – Wolfgang Nordwig, German pole vaulter
 3 September – Dagmar Schipanski, German physicist and politician (died 2022)
 7 September – Lena Valaitis, German singer
 16 September 
Oskar Lafontaine, German politician
Bärbel Wartenberg-Potter, German Lutheran bishop
 25 September – Willi Entenmann, footballer and coach (died 2012)
 27 September – Walter Riester, German politician
 28 September
 Michael Herz, German businessman
 Ursula Werner, German actress
 29 September – Wolfgang Overath, German footballer
 30 September – Johann Deisenhofer, German biochemist, Nobel Prize laureate
 6 October – Udo Zimmermann, German composer and opera director (died 2021)
 19 October – Axel Ullrich, German biologist
 20 October – Madeleine Schickedanz, German entrepreneur
 22 October – Wolfgang Thierse, German politician
 28 October – Cornelia Froboess, German actress
 20 November – Bernard Broermann, German businessman
 23 November – Günther Beckstein, German politician
 8 December – Bodo Tümmler, German Olympic middle-distance runner
 12 December – Renate Schmidt, German politician
 17 December – Heidemarie Koch, German archaeologist (died 2022)
 23 December – Queen Silvia of Sweden
 25 December – Hanna Schygulla, German actress
 31 December – Wolfgang Gerhardt, German politician

Deaths 

 13 January – Else Ury, German writer (born 1877)
 15 January – George of Saxony, Crown prince of Saxony (born 1893)
 14 February – David Hilbert, German mathematician (born 1862)
 22 February – Hans Scholl, German White Rose resistance member (executed by Nazis) (born 1918)
 22 February – Sophie Scholl, German White Rose resistance member (executed by Nazis) (born 1921)
 26 February – Theodor Eicke, German Nazi official (born 1892)
 10 March – Otto Modersohn, German painter (born 1865)	
 22 March – Hans Woellke, German shot putter (born 1911)
 13 April – Oskar Schlemmer, German painter, sculptor and choreographer (born 1888)
 24 April – Kurt von Hammerstein-Equord, German general (born 1878)	
 15 May – Ludwig Roselius, German businessman (born 1874)
 31 May – Helmut Kapp, German Gestapo official
 13 July – Luz Long, German long jump athlete (born 1913)
 21 July – Theodor von Guérard, German jurist and politician (born 1863)
 5 August – Liane Berkowitz, German resistance fighter of the Red Orchestra organisation (born 1923)
 2 September – Wilhelm Geiger, German Orientalist in the fields of Indo-Iranian languages (born 1856)
 16 September – Robert Schmidt, German politician (born 1864)
 22 September – Heinrich Waentig, German politician (born 1870)	
 23 September – Theodor Wolff, German writer and journalist (born 1868)	
 5 October – Ludwig von Estorff, German general (born 1859 in Germany)
 date unknown: Gottlob Walz, German diver (born 1881)

References

 
Years of the 20th century in Germany
Articles containing video clips
Germany
Germany